Palmetto is an unincorporated community in Oglethorpe County, in the U.S. state of Georgia.

History
The community was named for palmetto trees near the original town site.

References

Unincorporated communities in Oglethorpe County, Georgia
Unincorporated communities in Georgia (U.S. state)